Pattadakal Venkanna Raghavendra Rao was an Indian civil servant, writer and the sixth defence secretary of India. He assumed office on 21 November 1962, the day the Sino-Indian War ended and held the position until 3 April 1965. He was the author of three books, India's Defence Policy and Organisation Since Independence, Defence without drift and Red Tape and White Cap. The Government of India awarded him Padma Vibhushan, the second highest Indian civilian award, in 1967.

See also

 Govind Narain
 K.B. Lall

References

Further reading

External links
 
 
 

Recipients of the Padma Vibhushan in civil service
Indian civil servants
Indian political writers
Year of birth missing
Year of death missing